Polygyra septemvolva is a species of air-breathing land snail, a terrestrial gastropod mollusk in the family Polygyridae.

Description 
The shells of Polygyra septemvolva are known to show a high degree of variance in size within populations (6.6 - 14.8 mm). They have been proposed as a suitable model organism due to the ease of culturing and abundant reproduction in a suitable habitat.

Subspecies 

 Polygyra septemvolva febigeri
 Polygyra septemvolva volvoxis

References

Polygyridae